The capture of Belgrade was the recapture of Belgrade (capital of modern Serbia) by the Ottoman Empire in 1739.

Background

According to the Treaty of Pruth signed in 1711 between the Ottoman Empire and the Russian Empire, the Russians had stipulated to stop interfering in the affairs of the Polish–Lithuanian Commonwealth. In the War of the Polish Succession (1733–1738), Habsburg Austria and the Russian Empire were allies. The Ottomans saw this alliance as a violation of the treaty and engaged in a war against Russia. Being an ally of Russia, the Austrians also declared war on the Ottoman Empire in 1737. The Austrian army was defeated in two major battles, the Battle of Banja Luka and the Battle of Grocka, and had to fall back on Belgrade.

The siege
The Ottoman Empire had first captured Belgrade in 1521 (the first campaign of Suleyman I), but lost it to Eugene of Savoy of Austria in 1717 (see siege of Belgrade (1717)). The Ottomans had since then been waiting for an opportunity to regain the city. After the battle of Grocka the grand vizier Ivaz Mehmed Pasha laid siege to Belgrade (July 1739). In August, Hekimoğlu Ali Pasha (former grand vizier) joined him from the western front, a Bosnian militia also took part in the attack. After a siege of 51 days Count Wallis, the Austrian commander, ordered the burning of the Danubean fleet under his command and sued for peace.

Peace talks

During the peace talks in Belgrade, Wilhelm Reinhard von Neipperg represented Austria, while Ottoman delegates including Mektupçu Ragıp (future grand vizier Koca Ragıp) represented the Ottoman Empire. Changing the borders caused no big problem; Austria agreed to cede territories to the Ottoman side. The major issue, however, was the future of Belgrade. The earliest Austrian offer was to keep Belgrade in return for the territories ceded to Ottoman side, which the Ottoman representatives refused. The second offer of the Austrian side was to cede Belgrade on the condition that the fortifications were to be demolished. Ivaz Mehmed Pasha also refused this offer. Negotiations broke down. Finally,  Louis Sauveur Villeneuve, the French ambassador to the Ottoman Empire proposed a compromise in which only the former Ottoman fortification would be kept. Both sides agreed on the proposal and the treaty was signed on 18 September 1739.

Aftermath
Except for a brief occupation during the Austro-Turkish War (1787–1791) the Austrians were never able to capture Belgrade. The Ottomans kept the city up to the Serbian Uprising. Until 1878, Belgrade was a city of semi-independent Serbia under Ottoman suzerainty. Serbia gained full independence by the Treaty of Berlin (1878).

References

Belgrade 1739
Belgrade 1739
Conflicts in 1739
Military history of Belgrade
1739 in the Ottoman Empire
1739 in Europe
Ottoman Serbia
18th century in Belgrade
Russo-Turkish War (1735–1739)
Battles involving Bosnian militia (Ottoman)